Geven v Land Nordrhein-Westfalen (2007) C-213/05 is an EU law case, concerning the free movement of workers in the European Union.

Facts
A Dutch woman, Ms Geven, residing in the Netherlands, doing minor employment in Germany, claimed German child-raising allowance. German law required residence. Ms Geven claimed this violated her right to free movement under TFEU article 45.

Judgment
The Court of Justice, Grand Chamber, held the German government could justify the indirect discrimination of a residence requirement to claim the child benefit. Justifications could include encouraging the birth rate, allowing parents to care for children themselves by giving up employment, and benefiting people who had ‘established a real link with German society.’

See also

European Union law

Notes

References

European Union labour case law